Molly Fisk (born July 16, 1955) is an American poet and radio commentator. She has been teaching writing  since 1994 and runs the on-line workshop Poetry Boot Camp. Her most recent book is Naming Your Teeth: Even More Observations from a Working Poet. She was honored as an Academy of American Poets Laureate Fellow in 2019.

Biography
Mary (nickname, "Molly") Elizabeth Fisk was born July 16, 1955. Originally from San Francisco, Fisk earned her B.A. cum laude from Radcliffe College/ Harvard University in Folklore & Mythology, her M.B.A. with honors from Simmons College Graduate School of Management, and after working as a sweater designer/manufacturer (Northern Lights) and a Fortune-1000 lender (First National Bank of Chicago) began writing at the age of 35. Her previous work consists of the poetry collections The More Difficult Beauty (Hip Pocket Press, 2010), Listening to Winter (Roundhouse Press/Heyday Books, 2000), Terrain (with Dan Bellm and Forrest Hamer, Hip Pocket Press, 1998), and the letterpress chapbook Salt Water Poems (Jungle Garden Press, 1994), the essay collections Naming Your Teeth, Houston, We Have a Possum, Using Your Turn Signal Promotes World Peace, and Blow-Drying a Chicken (all Story Street Press).

Fisk has received fellowships from the National Endowment for the Arts, the California Arts Council, and the Marin Arts Council. Her prizes include the Dogwood Prize, the Robinson Jeffers Tor House Prize in Poetry, the National Writers Union Prize, and a grant from the Corporation for Public Broadcasting. She serves as Poet Laureate of Nevada County, California (2017-2019), Hell's Backbone Grill in Boulder, Utah, radio station KVMR-FM, Nevada City, California, and has appeared at TEDxSanFrancisco and TEDxGrassValley.

Fisk's radio commentary is heard weekly on the News Hour of KVMR-FM (Thursdays, 6:25 p.m. Pacific Time), and is carried on community stations in Illinois, Colorado, Wisconsin, and California.

Fisk teaches creative writing classes on-line and works privately as a Life Coach in the Skills for Change tradition. She has taught Writing to Heal, a technique that boosts the immune system, to cancer patients at Sierra Nevada Memorial Hospital since 2000. She taught creative writing at U.C. Davis Extension from 1997–2003, and edited The Healing Woman, a newsletter for childhood sexual abuse survivors, from 1997 to 2000. She taught with California Poets in the Schools from 1993–2006, editing three of their statewide anthologies.

Fisk is the niece by marriage of the American novelist John Updike. Her mother Antoinette Pennington Fisk (1932-2000) was the sister of Updike's first wife, Mary Pennington Updike Weatherall. She is the daughter of Irving Lester Fisk, II (1928-1984) and the granddaughter of ornithologist Erma Johnson Fisk, U.S. Assistant Secretary of Commerce (1957-1961) Bradley Fisk, Unitarian minister Leslie Talbot Pennington, and Elizabeth Daniels Pennington. Fisk's maternal great-grandfather, William Colet Johnson, helped to found Paul Revere Insurance.

Awards and honors
2019, Academy of American Poets Laureate Fellow
2017, Inaugural Poet Laureate of Nevada County, CA
2010, Corporation for Public Broadcasting Grant, KVMR-FM
2007, Dogwood Prize (for "Washington Square — New York, 1941")
2005, Robinson Jeffers Tor House Prize (for "Little Songs for Antoinette")
1999, Fellowship from the National Endowment for the Arts
1997, Artists Fellowship in Poetry from the California Arts Council
1996, Billee Murray Denny Prize (for "The Dry Tortugas")
1995, Individual Artists Grant in Poetry from the Marin Arts Council
1992, National Writers Union, Santa Cruz/Monterey Local 7 Prize (for "Veterans")

Works
Non-Fiction
Naming Your Teeth (Story Street Press, 2018)
Houston, We Have a Possum (Story Street Press, 2016), 
Using Your Turn Signal Promotes World Peace (Story Street Press, 2015)
Blow-Drying a Chicken: Observations from a Working Poet (Story Street Press, 2013)

Poetry
The More Difficult Beauty (Hip Pocket Press, 2010)
Listening to Winter, #4 in the California Poetry Series (Roundhouse/Heyday Books, 2000)
Terrain, a collaborative chapbook with Dan Bellm and Forrest Hamer (Hip Pocket Press,1998)
Salt Water Poems (Jungle Garden Press, 1994)
Surrender (audio-tape, 1994)

Commentary
Blow-Drying a Chicken (CD-KVMR, 2008)
Using Your Turn Signal Promotes World Peace (CD-KVMR, 2005)

Editor
2020, California Fire & Water: A Climate Crisis Anthology, Story Street Press 
2007, Open to All, Nevada County Library, with Steve Sanfield and Steve Fjeldsted
2001, California Poets in the Schools Statewide Anthology: Heart Flip
2000, California Poets in the Schools Statewide Anthology: 100 Parades
1997, California Poets in the Schools Statewide Anthology: Belonging to California

In other media
Fisk appeared in the award-winning PBS documentary The Loss of Nameless Things in 2005.

References

External links
 Official website
 KVMR-FM, Nevada City
 Poetry Boot Camp
 California Poets in the Schools
 https://web.archive.org/web/20110822094201/http://mollyfisk.com/bookscds

1955 births
Living people
American women poets
Simmons University alumni
National Endowment for the Arts Fellows
Writers from San Francisco
Radcliffe College alumni
21st-century American poets
21st-century American women writers
People from Nevada City, California